British Swimming is the national governing body of swimming, water polo, synchronised swimming, diving and open water in Great Britain. British Swimming is a federation of the national governing bodies of England (Swim England), Scotland (Scottish Swimming), and Wales (Swim Wales). These three are collectively known as the Home Country National Governing Bodies.

For international swimming purposes, competitive swimming in Northern Ireland falls under the Irish swimming federation, Swim Ireland, and as such British Swimming represents Great Britain, rather than the United Kingdom. For the Olympic Games, Northern Irish swimmers may opt to compete for British Swimming.

British Swimming is a member of FINA, LEN, the British Olympic Association and the British Paralympic Association, and has responsibility for elite performance, doping control and international relationships and events for the sports within the Great Britain. The Home Country National Governing Bodies are affiliated to British Swimming and are responsible for all other management of the sports in their respective countries from the learn to swim programmes up to performance development.

History
British Swimming became the primary organisation for Great British swimming in 2014, previously the Amateur Swimming Association (ASA) had been responsible for elite swimming.

Championships
British Swimming organises championships every year in each of the sporting disciplines.

Swimming
Long course

Short course
The British Swimming Short Course Championships were usually held in August or September each year, though the event has not been held since 2004

Water polo

Domestic water polo competition in the UK is centred on the National Water Polo League (NWPL) and National Women's Water Polo League (NWWPL), which operate through the autumn and winter. The British Championships organised by British Swimming are held in the Spring. Winners of the championships in recent years are listed below.

British Championships

Masters swimming
An annual championships for Masters swimmers is organised in rotation by the Home Countries, usually in June, for senior (18–24 yrs) and masters (25 yrs+). The championships are held in a long course (50 m) pool.
The championships are held in a long course (50 m) pool.

Open water swimming
Alongside the Open Water Grand Prix series, British Swimming also arranges national championship events over 5 km and 10 km.

Diving
The British Diving Championships are held annually in the winter. Sometimes the annual championships are held in the December of the preceding calendar year.

Synchronised swimming
The British Synchronised Swimming Championships are usually held in November or December each year.

Sponsorship 
In 2009, British Swimming announced a £15 million, 6 year sponsorship deal with British Gas. It also announced sponsorship with Kellogg's and Speedo in 2009. In 2016, British Swimming announced a new sponsorship deal with TYR Sport, Inc.

Further reading
Keil, Ian/Wix, Don, In the Swim. The Amateur Swimming Association from 1869 to 1994, London 1996

See also
British records in swimming
List of Olympic size swimming pools in the United Kingdom

References

External links
 Official site

Great Britain
Swimming
Swimming organisations based in the United Kingdom
United Kingdom
Sports organizations established in 1869
Organisations based in Leicestershire
Loughborough Sport
1869 establishments in the United Kingdom